Berninghaus is a surname. Notable people with the surname include:

Charles Berninghaus (1905–1988), American painter
Oscar E. Berninghaus (1874–1952), American painter